Lon melane, the umber skipper,  is a butterfly of the family Hesperiidae. It is found in California (west of the Sierra Nevada divide), southern Arizona, Baja California, the highlands of Mexico and Central America. The habitat consists of desert foothills, grassy areas, streamsides, roadsides, yards, parks and open oak woodland.

The wingspan is 32–35 mm. The wings are umber brown, the forewing with a darker disc and pale spots and the hindwing with a light yellow-brown band. There are two generations per year with adults on wing from March to May and again from September to October. They feed on flower nectar.

The larvae feed on the leaves of various grasses, including Cynodon dactylon, Deschampsia caespitosa, Lamarckia aurea, Stenotaphrum secundatum, Carex spissa, Phyllostachys bambusoides, Ehrharta erecta, Lolium multiflorum, Paspalum dilatatum, Pennisetum clandestinum, Sorghum sudanense, Digitaria sanguinalis, Bromus carinatus, Dactylis glomerata, Agrostis palustris, Festuca myuros, Festuca rubra, Agropyron cristatum and Poa pratensis. They live in shelters made of rolled or tied leaves.

Subspecies
Lon melane melane (California)
Lon melane poa (Evans, 1955) (Costa Rica)
Lon melane vitellina (Herrich-Schäffer, 1869) (Mexico)

References

Butterflies described in 1869
Lon
Butterflies of North America